Montserratian may refer to:
 Something of, from, or related to Montserrat, is a British overseas territory located in the Leeward Islands, part of the chain of islands called the Lesser Antilles in the Caribbean Sea
 A person from Montserrat, or of Montserratian descent. For information about the Montserratian people, see Demographics of Montserrat and Culture of Montserrat. For specific persons, see List of Montserratians.
 Note that there is no language called "Montserratian".  For the most widely spoken languages in Montserrat, see Languages of Montserrat.
 Montserratian cuisine

See also 
 

Language and nationality disambiguation pages